The Cosmology of Bing is the fourth novel by American author Mitch Cullin.  It was first published in April 2001 as a hardback edition from The Permanent Press.

References 

2001 American novels
Native American novels
Novels by Mitch Cullin
Novels set in Texas
Permanent Press (publisher) books